Tây Ninh is a provincial city in south-eastern Vietnam. It is the capital of Tây Ninh Province, which encompasses the town and much of the surrounding farmland. Tay Ninh is one of nine provinces and cities in the Southern Key Economic Region (Hochiminh City, Dong Nai, Binh Duong, Ba Ria – Vung Tau, Binh Phuoc, Tay Ninh, Long An and Tien Giang).

Tourist attractions
The city is known for being the home of the Cao Dai religion, a syncretic Vietnamese faith that includes the teachings of the major world religions.

Besides the Cao Dai Holy See, other tourist attractions include:

 Black Virgin Mountain, the tallest mountain in southern Vietnam 
 Dau Tieng Lake, one of the largest man-made lakes in Vietnam and Southeast Asia.
 Lò Gò-Xa Mát National Park
 Thien Lam or Go Ken Pagoda
 Chang Riec Forest
 Mộc Bài International Border Gate
 Long Hoa central market

Agriculture industry

Tay Ninh has relatively favorable natural conditions for agricultural development (flat land, mild climate, no drought, no flood). In 2015, the total cultivated area reached 929,832 acres, including 646,996 acres of annual crops and 282,836 acres of perennial crops. Tay Ninh agriculture accounts for about 28% of the province's economic structure with the agricultural production area of 665,331 acres, accounting for 66.7% of the natural area. Some popular crop including:

 Wet rice (approximately 365,000 acres)
 Sugar-apple 
 Rubber tree (approximately 247,000 acres)
 Sugarcane (approximately 61,000 acres)
 Cassava (approximately 123,000 acres)

Notable people
 Nguyễn Thị Ngọc Châu - Miss Universe Vietnam 2022
 Nguyễn Văn Nên - Secretary of the Ho Chi Minh City Party Committee

Education
 Hoang Le Kha High School for the Gifted
 Tay Ninh High School
 Ly Thuong Kiet High School
 Tran Dai Nghia High School
 IGC Tay Ninh (escalator school)
 Tay Ninh College of Education

History
After the Fall of Saigon, the town of Tây Ninh was reorganized to comprise three wards and one commune. In August 2001, the town was expanded to include five wards and five communes. On 29 December 2013, Tây Ninh town was upgraded officially to provincial city status, under administration of Tây Ninh Province, along with the upgrade of its two communes Ninh Sơn and Ninh Thạnh to ward status.

Climate

Administrative division
Tây Ninh city, Vietnam comprises 7 wards (phường) and 3 communes (xã):
 Ward 1
 Ward 2
 Ward 3
 Ward 4
 Hiệp Ninh Ward
 Ninh Sơn Ward 
 Ninh Thạnh Ward 
 Bình Minh Commune
 Tân Bình Commune
 Thạnh Tân Commune

The ward is further divided into quarters (khu phố). Thee commune are further divided into hamlets (ấp).

References

External links

Populated places in Tây Ninh province
Districts of Tây Ninh province
Provincial capitals in Vietnam
Cities in Vietnam